Silver Springs Shores East is a census-designated place (CDP) in southeastern Marion County, Florida, United States.

Silver Springs Shores East was first listed as a CDP for the 2020 census, at which time it had a population of 1,210.

Demographics

References 

Census-designated places in Marion County, Florida
Census-designated places in Florida